The Rolex China Sea Race is a biennial event hosted by the Royal Hong Kong Yacht Club, starting in Hong Kong Harbour and finishing in Subic Bay, Philippines. The race distance is approximately 565 nautical miles (1046.38 km). The first race was held in 1962. Between 1997 and 2009 the President´s Cup Regatta, held in Manila Bay and Subic Bay, was the in-shore part of the China Sea Race.

References

Yachting races
Biennial sporting events
Sailing competitions in China
Sailing competitions in the Philippines